is one of eight wards in the city of Hiroshima, Japan. The Hiroshima–Nishi Airport was located in Nishi-ku.

Geography
The ward of Nishi-ku is in the southwest part of Hiroshima. There are many mountains, but the other wards are mostly larger in area. There are many mountains in the north of the ward of Nishi-ku, and its width (geographic plane) is very narrow. It borders the ocean (Hiroshima Bay) to the south.

Neighbors
North: Asaminami Ward
East: Center Ward
South: Hiroshima Bay
West: Saeki Ward

Economy
Sporting equipment companies Mikasa Sports and Molten Corporation have their headquarters in Nishi-ku.

References

Wards of Hiroshima